Panorama (stylised in all caps) is the second studio album by American singer and actress Hayley Kiyoko, released on July 29, 2022, through Empire and Atlantic.

Background
Before the release of the extended play I'm Too Sensitive for This Shit, Kiyoko had already announced that she had plans to work on her sophomore studio album on December 6, 2018, at the 2018 Billboard Women in Music Awards in an interview with Billboard.

At the 30th Annual GLAAD Media Awards on March 28, 2019, Kiyoko confirmed that after touring Europe for both her Expectations Tour and European Encore Tour for the last couple of months, she has started working on new music for her second album. She also stated that the "color palette" of this project is "darker" than her debut album, Expectations (2018).

On February 6, 2020, during a livestream on Instagram about her Hue fragrance Kiyoko talked about the album. She revealed that the album has a similar sound to "What I Need":

Critical reception

Panorama received mixed reviews from critics upon release. Writing for Pitchfork, Emma Madden said that the album's theme of "embracing the journey and the struggle, rather than the destination, feels as bromidic and remote as a commercial for therapy" and that Kiyoko "hides behind well-trodden pop star guises" on the album, meaning it ultimately "carries the unmistakable metallic tang of reverse engineering". The Guardians Ammar Kalia called Kiyoko's return four years after Expectations "altogether flatter", opining that "where Expectations saw Kiyoko taking space to explore her own voice, Panorama feels like a leap backwards, trading personality for affectless tracks that fade into the background".

Track listingNotesall tracks stylised in lowercase
  indicates an additional producer
  indicates a vocal producer

PersonnelMusicians Hayley Kiyoko – vocals (all tracks), programming (track 12)
 Danja – instrumentation, programming (1, 2, 4–10)
 Nikki Flores – vocal arrangement (1, 2, 4–11, 13)
 Peter Johnson – strings (5, 9)
 Johnny Rain – vocals (6)
 Kill Dave – programming (12)
 Pat Morrissey – programming (12)Technical'
 Tatsuya Sato – mastering (1–11)
 Michelle Mancini – mastering (12)
 Rob Kinelski – mixing
 Damien Lewis – engineering
 Chad Jolley – engineering (1–11)
 Jono Dorr – engineering (11)
 Dave Dahlquist – engineering (13)
 Casey Cuayo – mixing assistance
 Eli Heisler – mixing assistance
 Maysun Toffiee – engineering assistance (2, 4–8)

Charts

References

2022 albums
Atlantic Records albums
Empire Distribution albums
Hayley Kiyoko albums